Shifang Temple, also known as Guangren Temple, is a Buddhist temple located on Mount Wutai, in Taihuai Town of Wutai County, Shanxi, China.

History
The temple was first established in the Daoguang period (1821–1850) of the Qing dynasty (1644–1911).

In 1983, it has been designated as a National Key Buddhist Temple in Han Chinese Area by the State Council of China.

Architecture
The extant structure is based on the Qing dynasty building principles and retains the traditional architectural style. The temple is divided into three countyards with three halls, namely the Hall of Four Heavenly Kings, Hall of Maitreya and Hall of Je Tsongkhapa.

Hall of Maitreya
The Hall of Maitreya enshrining Maitreya Buddha, who is regarded as the future Buddha and Sakyamuni's successor.

A set of Kangyur which was printed between 1821 and 1850 is preserved in the hall.

Hall of Je Tsongkhapa
The Hall of Je Tsongkhapa houses a copper statue of Je Tsongkhapa, who was a famous teacher of Tibetan Buddhism whose activities led to the formation of the Gelug school of Tibetan Buddhism. In the two interior walls one thousand miniature Buddha statues are inlaid in the alcoves.

References

Tibetan Buddhist temples in Shanxi
Buddhist temples on Mount Wutai
Tourist attractions in Xinzhou
19th-century establishments in China
19th-century Buddhist temples
Gelug monasteries and temples
Maitreya